"I Can't Get You Off of My Mind" is a song written and recorded by Hank Williams.  It appeared as the B-side to his 1948 single "A Mansion on the Hill".

Background
It was recorded on November 6, 1947 at Castle Studio in Nashville.  Williams was supported by a group that producer Fred Rose assembled from two Grand Ole Opry bands: Zeke Turner (lead guitar), Jerry Byrd (steel guitar), and Louis Ennis (rhythm guitar) were from Red Foley's band while Chubby Wise (fiddle) was a member of Bill Monroe's band. The song is an up-tempo number in which the narrator describes his infatuation with an unfaithful woman.

Bob Dylan recorded the song for the 2001 album Timeless: Hank Williams Tribute.  In his autobiography Chronicles: Volume One Dylan wrote, "The sound of his voice went through me like an electric rod and I managed to get a hold of a few of his 78s - "Baby, We're Really in Love" and "Honky Tonkin'" and "Lost Highway" - and I played them endlessly...You can learn a lot about the structure of songwriting by listening to his records, and I listened to them a lot and had them internalized."

The The also recorded it for their Williams tribute LP Hanky Panky.

References

1947 songs
Songs written by Hank Williams
Hank Williams songs
Song recordings produced by Fred Rose (songwriter)
MGM Records singles